Alphonsea lucida is a species of plant in the family Annonaceae. It is endemic to Peninsular Malaysia.

References

lucida
Endemic flora of Peninsular Malaysia
Vulnerable plants
Taxonomy articles created by Polbot